Adrian Hipkins Clarke (born 23 February 1938) is a former New Zealand rugby union player and politician. He represented the All Blacks from 1958 to 1960, and unsuccessfully stood for the National Party in the Henderson electorate at the 1969 general election.

Early life and family
Clarke was born in Christchurch on 23 February 1938, the son of Hazel Clarke (née Shoesmith) and Vernon Hipkins Clarke. He was educated at Avondale College, Auckland. His younger brother, Phil, also played for the All Blacks.

in 1962, Clarke married Pauline Innes McDonald, and the couple went on to have four children.

Rugby union
A first or second five-eighth, Clarke represented  at a provincial level, and was a member of the New Zealand national side, the All Blacks, from 1958 to 1960. He played 14 matches for the All Blacks including three internationals.

Politics
At the 1969 general election, Clarke was the National Party's candidate in the newly formed Henderson electorate. However, he lost to the Labour candidate, Martyn Finlay, by almost 3300 votes.

Other activities
Clarke worked as an insurance agent, and later was proprietor of Waipapakauri Hotel in the Northland settlement of Awanui. He also was the owner of a commercial crayfish boat, and was active in Rotary.

References

1938 births
Living people
Rugby union players from Christchurch
People educated at Avondale College
New Zealand rugby union players
New Zealand international rugby union players
Auckland rugby union players
Rugby union fly-halves
Rugby union centres
New Zealand National Party politicians
Unsuccessful candidates in the 1969 New Zealand general election